Frank Sandeman (born 28 August 1936) was a Scottish football player and manager, who played as an inside forward for Heart of Midlothian.

External links
London Hearts profile

1936 births
Living people
Footballers from Dundee
Association football inside forwards
Scottish footballers
Scottish Football League players
Scottish football managers
Scottish Football League managers
Montrose F.C. players
East Stirlingshire F.C. players
Heart of Midlothian F.C. players
Arbroath F.C. players
Brechin City F.C. players
Brechin City F.C. managers